Pterogonia nubes is a moth of the family Nolidae first described by George Hampson in 1893. It is found in Sri Lanka, Peninsular Malaysia, Sumatra, Borneo, the Philippines and Sulawesi.

Description
Its forewings are dark reddish brown. A pale bluish-gray speckled streak is visible. Forewing margin of male is round and female is angled centrally.

References

Moths of Asia
Moths described in 1893
Nolidae